Traffic Circle is a glacier-filled expanse 500 m high, situated south of Mount Ptolemy and medially on Antarctic Peninsula between Marguerite Bay and Mobiloil Inlet. Hub Nunatak rises from the center of the Traffic Circle. From this position, five glacial troughs radiate like the spokes of a wheel. One connects on the north with Gibbs Glacier and Neny Glacier, leading to Neny Fjord. Another connects on the west with Lammers Glacier and Windy Valley, leading to Mikkelsen Bay. A third, Cole Glacier, trends southwest along Godfrey Upland toward the Wordie Ice Shelf area. The fourth, Weyerhaeuser Glacier, trends southward toward Wakefield Highland and connects with glaciers leading westward to Wordie Ice Shelf. The fifth, Mercator Ice Piedmont, is nourished by the outflow from Weyerhaeuser, Cole and Gibbs Glaciers; it broadens as it descends eastward to the head of Mobiloil Inlet. Discovered in 1940 by members of the East Base party of the United States Antarctic Service (USAS), 1939–41, who used this system of troughs in traveling across the upland, hence the name Traffic Circle.

Glaciers of Graham Land
Bowman Coast